In mathematics, Reeb sphere theorem, named after Georges Reeb, states that

 A closed oriented connected manifold M n that admits a singular foliation having only centers  is homeomorphic to the sphere Sn and the foliation has exactly two singularities.

Morse foliation

A singularity of a foliation F is of Morse type if in its small neighborhood all leaves of the foliation are level sets of a Morse function, being the singularity a critical point of the function.  The singularity is a center if it is a local extremum of the function; otherwise, the singularity is a saddle.

The number of centers c and the number of saddles , specifically , is tightly connected with the manifold topology.

We denote , the index of a singularity , where k is the index of the corresponding critical point of a Morse function. In particular, a center has index 0, index of a saddle is at least 1.

A Morse foliation F on a manifold M is a singular transversely oriented codimension one foliation of class  with isolated singularities such that:
 each singularity of F is of Morse type,
 each singular leaf L contains a unique singularity p; in addition, if  then  is not connected.

Reeb sphere theorem
This is the case , the case without saddles.

Theorem: Let  be a closed oriented connected manifold of dimension . Assume that  admits a -transversely oriented codimension one foliation  with a non empty set of singularities all of them centers.

It is a consequence of the Reeb stability theorem.

Generalization

More general case is 

In 1978, Edward Wagneur generalized the Reeb sphere theorem to Morse foliations with saddles. He showed that the number of centers cannot be too much as compared with the number of saddles, notably, . So there are exactly two cases when :

(1)   

(2)   

He obtained a description of the manifold admitting a foliation with singularities that satisfy (1).

Theorem: Let  be a compact connected manifold admitting  a Morse foliation  with  centers and  saddles. Then . 
In case ,

 all saddles have index 1,

Finally, in 2008, César Camacho and Bruno Scardua considered the case (2), . This is possible in a small number of low dimensions.

If , then

  is an Eells–Kuiper manifold.

References

Foliations
Theorems in topology